Christina Olmi (born February 20, 1984) is a beauty queen from Albuquerque, New Mexico, crowned Miss New Mexico 2008. She has since passed her title of Miss New Mexico to the new 2009 representative, and moved to Los Angeles to pursue a career in the entertainment industry.

External links
 
 Christina Olmi's official website
 Christina Olmi's 2009 Miss America contestant profile (MissAmerica.org)

People from Albuquerque, New Mexico
1984 births
Living people
Miss America 2009 delegates
American beauty pageant winners